USNS Burlington (T-EPF-10) is the tenth  and operated by the United States Navys Military Sealift Command. It is the first ship in naval service named after Burlington, Vermont’s largest city.

Construction and career 

Burlington was christened on 24 February 2018 by ship's sponsor Marcelle Leahy and launched at Austal USA in Mobile, Alabama on 1 March 2018. The U.S. Navy accepted delivery of Burlington on 15 November 2018.

References

External links

Transports of the United States Navy
Ships built in Mobile, Alabama
Spearhead-class Joint High Speed Vessels
2018 ships